Wheelock and similar may refer to:

Firms and buildings
 Cooper Wheelock, a manufacturer of fire alarm and general signaling products
 Wheelock and Company, formerly British Hong Wheelock and Marden Company Limited
 Wheelock College, a small liberal arts college in Boston, Massachusetts
 Wheelock House, a building in City of Victoria, Hong Kong
 Wheelock Place, a building in Singapore

People
 Wheelock (name)

Places
 River Wheelock in Cheshire in England
 Wheelock Parkway, St. Paul, Minnesota, a historic street in St. Paul, Minnesota
 Wheelock, Cheshire, a long village south of Sandbach in Cheshire in England
 Wheelock, North Dakota, a ghost town in the United States
 Wheelock, Texas, a small town
 Wheelock, Vermont, town in northern Vermont

Other
 Wheellock, a mechanism for firing a gun
 Wheelock's Latin, a well-known beginning Latin textbook
 The word "wheelock" occasionally occurs as an improper usage of wheel clamp